The 1978–79 Yugoslav Ice Hockey League season was the 37th season of the Yugoslav Ice Hockey League, the top level of ice hockey in Yugoslavia. Six teams participated in the league, and Olimpija have won the championship.

Regular season

Final
 Olimpija – Jesenice 5–3/11–7

External links
Season on hrhockey

Yugoslav
Yugoslav Ice Hockey League seasons
1978–79 in Yugoslav ice hockey